William Curtis Rogers (June 24, 1913 – April 30, 1977) was an American football player.

A native of Westborough, Massachusetts, Rogers attended Westborough High School and Brighton Academy and then played college football at Villanova University.

He then played professional football in the National Football League (NFL) as a tackle for the Detroit Lions. He appeared in 25 games for the Lions from 1938 to 1940 and 1944.

References

1913 births
1977 deaths
American football tackles
Villanova Wildcats football players
Detroit Lions players
Players of American football from Massachusetts